Murtala Muhammed Square is a public square in the City of Kaduna, Kaduna State, Nigeria formerly known as the Kaduna Race Course. Its renamed in honour of the then military Head of State Murtala Ramat Muhammed.

Building 
It include several recreational and sporting facilities which people from around the metropolis go to do physical fitness activities, such as gymnasiums, indoor sport hall, football fields, hockey pitch, etc.

Sports 
The Square is also the venue of the Kaduna Polo Club ground, Kaduna State Ministry of Youth, Sport and Culture, Umaru Musa Yaradua Indoor Sport Hall among others.

International, national and local celebrations have been taken place in the Square since it inception, annual and occasional celebrations like Kaduna Grand Durbar, Kaduna Centenary Celebrations, Nigeria's Independence Day, May Day, Inauguration Ceremony of Governors, Army Day, Human Rights Day etc.

See also 

 Kaduna Polo Club
 Ranchers Bees Stadium
 Ahmadu Bello Stadium

Gallery

References

National squares
Buildings and structures in Nigeria
Tourist attractions in Kaduna State
Sports venues in Kaduna State